Isle Ristol, the innermost of the Summer Isles in Scotland, is a Scottish Wildlife Trust Reserve.

Access is by boat from Old Dornie.

Over fifty higher species have been identified amongst the flora on the Isle Ristol machair, amongst which are moonwort and adder's tongue.

Isle Ristol was a site of a British Fishery Society station in the late 18th century.

References

Tidal islands of Scotland
Summer Isles
Uninhabited islands of Highland (council area)